The 5.8×42mm / DBP87 ("Dàn (弹) Bùqiāng (步枪) Pŭtōng (普通), 1987"; literally "Standard Rifle Cartridge, 1987") is a military rimless bottlenecked intermediate cartridge developed in the People's Republic of China. There is limited information on this cartridge, although the People's Liberation Army claims that it is superior to the 5.56×45mm NATO and Soviet 5.45×39mm cartridges.

Another variant called the DBP88 "heavy round" was designed specifically for squad automatic weapons and designated marksman rifles. The 5.8×42mm "heavy round" cartridge has the same dimensions as the standard 5.8×42mm cartridge, but utilizes a longer streamlined bullet with a heavy steel core for increased performance at extended ranges and penetration. As of 2010, all 5.8×42mm cartridge variants have been succeeded by the DBP10 variant.

History 

The Chinese armaments industry and the Chinese military were informed about the developments and experience that the US armed forces had during the Vietnam War with the M16 rifle and its 5.56×45mm M193 ammunition – not least because of the arms aid for Vietnam, as a result of which there was a high probability that captured US small arms and ammunition reached China. In March 1971, the so-called "Conference 713" was held in Beijing, at which future developments in the field of infantry weapons were discussed and criteria for infantry weapons and ammunition were established.

The new ammunition to be developed should have a caliber of around 6 mm and a muzzle velocity of around 1,000 m/s. Compared to the standard 7.62×39mm cartridge, recoil and weight were to be reduced whilst accuracy and terminal ballistics had to be improved. At the "744 Conference" the caliber choice was narrowed down to either 5.8 mm or 6 mm. Seven different case designs were presented, which required overall cartridge lengths between 56 mm and 59.5 mm. The actual development began in 1978. 

In 1979 the caliber and case length choices were determined and China started the development of the 5.8×42mm cartridge and finalized the cartridge in 1987. The 5.8×42mm / DBP87 was designed to replace the Soviet 7.62×39mm and 5.45×39mm cartridges used by the People's Liberation Army (PLA). The Type 95 / QBZ-95 (Chinese: 轻武器,步枪,自动, 1995; Pinyin: Qīng wǔqì, Bùqiāng, Zìdòng, 1995; literally "Light weapon, Rifle, Automatic, 1995") 5.8 mm caliber assault rifle, firing the 5.8×42mm / DBP87 or the improved DBP95, is now the standard issue weapon in the PLA. The DBP87 service round was quickly supplemented in 1988 by the DBP88 round which was loaded with a heavier more aerodynamic projectile for improved extended range performance.

The 5.8×42mm is an example of an international tendency towards relatively small-sized, lightweight, high-velocity military service cartridges. Cartridges like the Belgian 5.56×45mm NATO, Soviet 5.45×39mm, and Chinese 5.8×42mm allow a soldier to carry more ammunition for the same weight compared to their larger and heavier predecessor cartridges, have favourable maximum point-blank range or "battle zero" characteristics and produce relatively low bolt thrust and free recoil impulse, favouring light weight arms design and automatic fire accuracy.

In June 2004, an improved version of the 5.8×42mm cartridge entered development as the matching ammunition for the revised assault rifle, Type 95-1. Both designs were finalized in 2010 and production began the same year. This new cartridge is known as DBP10.

To improve accuracy and barrel life the barrel was also redesigned. The number of rifling grooves was increased from 4 to 6. The diameter of the lands was slightly increased from 5.8 to 5.84 mm to 5.82 to 5.86 mm. The groove diameter was decreased from 6.01 to 6.07 mm to 5.98 to 6.02 mm. In addition, the twist rate in the revised 95-1 assault rifle was reduced from 240 mm to 210 mm. These changes reduced the rifling twist rate from 41.2 to 36 calibers.

The People's Liberation Army claims that the 5.8×42mm is superior to the 5.56×45mm NATO SS109 and the 5.45×39mm 7N6; stating it has better armor penetration of 10 mm at 300 meters, a flatter trajectory, and a higher retention of velocity and energy downrange.

5.8×42mm cartridge variants

DBP87
The bullet has a ballistic coefficient (G7 BC) of approximately 0.156.

In order to save cost, several compromises were made. In particular, the cartridge case is made of steel, which is cheaper than brass. To reduce the chance of rust, the case is covered in a thin layer of protective paint in dark brown. To ensure high extraction reliability, the case has a thick rim and a large extractor groove.

DBP88
The bullet has a ballistic coefficient (G7 BC) of approximately 0.210.

The DBP95 cartridge was developed in 1995 for the QBZ-95. The DBP95 is an improved version of the DBP87 that uses a cleaner propellant and non corrosive primer. Its performance remains similar and the production costs are higher, but the negative effects on the weapon are reduced. It is basically the same round as the DBP87 other than these minor differences, and was used until 2010 when it was replaced by the DBP10.

DBP10
As such, it was introduced to consolidate and replace all previous DBP87/95 and DBP88 5.8×42mm rounds. The bullet has a ballistic coefficient (G7 BC) of approximately 0.193.

Major improvements include a non-corrosive primer, a copper-coated steel case with a copper alloy bullet jacket with a  diameter hardened steel core for better penetration of (body) armor. It also uses a cleaner burning propellant so as not to leave residue inside the weapon after firing. However, although testing of the previous DBP87/95 5.8 mm rounds showed that they were less likely to cause serious wounds, the issue was not addressed with the new DBP10 round.

The DBP10 cartridge weighs . R50 at a specific range means the closest 50 percent of the shot group will all be within a circle of the mentioned diameter at that range. The circular error probable method employed by the Chinese and other (European) militaries cannot be converted and is not comparable to the common US methods (groupsize of 5 or 10 successive shots fired at 100 yards) for determining accuracy.

DBU141
The QBU-141, a small caliber sniper rifle intended to be used with 5.8×42mm DBU-141 high-precision ammunition in a 10-round box magazine. The specifically designed munition improves accuracy, whereas China's previous sniper/designated marksman rifles use standard machine gun rounds.

DBP191
According to Chinese media, the new generation service rifle QBZ-191 introduced in 2019 is chambered in 5.8×42mm caliber. Allong with the new service rifle redesigned DBP-191 ammunition was inroduced that has better ballistic performance.

Use 
 Chinese Type 87 assault rifle
 Chinese Type 95 / QBZ-95 assault rifle
 Chinese Type 95B / QBZ-95B carbine
 Chinese Type 95 LSW / Type 95 SAW / QBB-95 light support weapon / squad automatic weapon
 Chinese Type 88 / QJY-88 light machine gun
 Chinese Type 88 / QBU-88 designated marksman rifle
 Chinese Type 03 / QBZ-03 assault rifle
 Chinese Type 191 / QBZ-191 assault rifle
 Chinese Type 192 / QBZ-192 carbine
 Chinese Type 191 / QBU-191 designated marksman rifle
 Chinese Type 191 / QJB-191 light support weapon / squad automatic weapon
 Chinese QBU-141 sniper rifle
 Chinese QJS-161 light machine gun
 Chinese integrated combat system QTS-11

See also
 5 mm caliber
 .22 Savage Hi-Power
 6 mm SAW
 .243 Winchester
 6.5×54mm Mannlicher–Schönauer
 6mm BR
 List of rifle cartridges
 Table of handgun and rifle cartridges

References

External links
Photo of 5.8 × 42mm ammunition
QBZ-95 assault rifle
QBZ-95 5.8mm Automatic Weapons

5.8 mm firearms
Pistol and rifle cartridges
Military cartridges
Weapons and ammunition introduced in 1987